General Sir Malcolm Cartwright Cartwright-Taylor,  (29 October 1911 – 5 November 1969) was a British Royal Marines officer who served as Commandant General Royal Marines from 1962 to 1965.

Military career
Educated at Rugby School, Cartwright-Taylor was commissioned into the Royal Marines in 1930 and served in the Second World War in the battleship , at the Royal Marines Depot at Exton and at Headquarters, 117th Infantry Brigade. He was appointed Fleet Royal Marines Officer for the South Atlantic Fleet in 1950, Major General Royal Marines at Plymouth in 1959 and Commandant General Royal Marines in 1962. In that role he deployed 2,000 Royal Marines to Malaysia during the Indonesia–Malaysia confrontation before retiring in 1965.

In retirement he became a member of the Membership Arbitration Panel of the Association of British Travel Agents.

References

1911 births
1969 deaths
Royal Marines generals
Royal Marines personnel of World War II
Knights Commander of the Order of the Bath
20th-century Royal Marines personnel
People educated at Rugby School
Military personnel from Nottinghamshire